Camarasa is a municipality in the comarca of the Noguera in Catalonia, Spain. It is situated at the confluence of the Segre and Noguera Pallaresa rivers. The Camarasa reservoir on the Noguera Pallaresa (113 hm³) and the Sant Llorenç de Montgai reservoir on the Segre are important hydroelectric power stations.

The C-147 road links the municipality with Balaguer and Tremp, and there are Renfe railway stations in Sant Llorenç de Montgai and L'Ametlla de Montsec.

The municipality includes a small exclave to the north.

Demography

References

 Panareda Clopés, Josep Maria; Rios Calvet, Jaume; Rabella Vives, Josep Maria (1989). Guia de Catalunya, Barcelona: Caixa de Catalunya.  (Spanish).  (Catalan).

External links 
Official website 
 Government data pages 

Municipalities in Noguera (comarca)
Populated places in Noguera (comarca)